Mount Roe is a flattish, largely ice-covered mountain overlooking the west side of Liv Glacier. It stands 1 nautical mile (1.9 km) northeast of Mount Wells at the southeast end of Prince Olav Mountains. Named by Advisory Committee on Antarctic Names (US-ACAN) for Lieutenant Donald W. Roe, Jr., of U.S. Navy Squadron VX-6, a member of the 1961 winter party at McMurdo Station and squadron safety officer in the 1962–63 season.
 

Mountains of the Ross Dependency
Dufek Coast